Destiny's Child is the debut studio album by American R&B group Destiny's Child, released by Columbia Records and Music World Entertainment on February 17, 1998. It features the singles "No, No, No" and "With Me", both of which preceded the album.  The album spent twenty six weeks on the US Billboard 200 chart and peaked at number sixty-seven. To date the album has sold a total of 831,000 copies in America. In the United Kingdom, it reached the top fifty, peaking at number forty-five. It was re-packaged and re-released in several countries after the success of the follow-up album, The Writing's on the Wall (1999). The album was met with generally favorable reviews from music critics, including AllMusic and Rolling Stone, and won a Soul Train Lady of Soul Award for Best R&B/Soul Album of the Year.

Critical reception

Rolling Stone gave the album a mixed review. John Bush of the website AllMusic feels that "Destiny's Child isn't quite just another debut album from an R&B girl group... Their voices sound beautiful together. Still, much of the album sounds indistinguishable from all the other female groups out there.

Commercial performance
Destiny's Child was a moderate chart success. It peaked at number sixty-seven on the US Billboard 200 and at number fourteen on the US Billboard Top R&B/Hip-Hop Albums. It was more successful outside the United States: it reached number sixteen on the Canadian Albums Chart, number nineteen on the Dutch MegaCharts albums chart and number forty-five on the UK Albums Chart. The album was certified gold by the Recording Industry Association of America (RIAA) in July 1998, and later earned a platinum certification on July 11, 2000, for 1 million copies shipped to stores .

Track listing
Credits adapted from the album's liner notes

Notes
  signifies a co-producer
  signifies an additional producer
 Some copies of the album credit no writers for "Illusion".

Sample Credits
 "Second Nature" contains replayed elements from "Make Me Say It Again Girl", performed by the Isley Brothers, written by Marvin Isley, Ronald Isley, Rudolph Isley, Ernie Isley and O'Kelly Isley.
 "No, No, No Part 2" contains elements from "Strange Games & Things", performed and written by Barry White.
 "With Me Parts I & II" contain a sample of "Freak Hoes", performed by TRU, written by Master P.
 "Bridges" contains replayed elements from "Simply Beautiful", performed and written by Al Green.

Personnel
Credits are taken from Destiny's Child liner notes.

 Mark Morales – producer
 Bill Ortiz – trumpet
 Darin Prindle – mixing
 Warren Riker – engineer, mixing
 Bob Robinson – arranger, producer, multi instruments
 Tim Kelley – arranger, producer, multi instruments
 Carl Washington – producer
 Carl Wheeler – keyboards
 D'Wayne Wiggins – bass, producer, guitar, multi instruments
 Benjamin Wright – arranger, conductor
 Eric Fischer – engineer
 Jay Lincoln – drums, producer, mixing, keyboards
 James Hoover – engineer
 Erwin Gorostiza – art direction, design
 Wyclef Jean – producer, performer
 Rawle Gittens – engineer
 Vince Lars – saxophone
 Cory Rooney – programming, producer, mixing
 Craig B – producer, mixing
 KLC – producer
 Sylvia Bennett-Smith – arranger, producer
 Jerry Duplessis – producer
 Joey Swails – engineer, mixing
 Ian Dalsemer – assistant engineer
 Rob Fusari – producer
 Anthony Papa Michael – acoustic guitar
 Beyoncé Knowles – lead vocals, background vocals
 LeToya Luckett – background vocals
 LaTavia Roberson – background vocals, rap vocals on "Illusion"
 Kelly Rowland – lead vocals, background vocals
 Lee Neal – drums
 O'Dell – producer
 Mathew Knowles – executive producer
 Tina Knowles – hair stylist
 Storm Jefferson – assistant engineer, mixing assistant
 Mean Green – production coordination
 Che Greene – producer
 Darcy Aldridge – arranger
 Mike Arnold – engineer
 Charles Brackins – engineer
 Johnny Buick – make-up and hair stylist
 Kenny Demery – guitar
 Paul Empson – photography
 Eric Ferrell – make-up
 Pras – performer
 Debra Ginyard – stylist
 Mike Scott – mixing
 Booker T. Jones III – mixing
 Master P – performer
 Terry T – producer
 Bill McKinley – bass
 Paul Arnold – engineer
 Preston Crump – bass
 Jermaine Dupri – producer, performer
 Dale Everingham
 Steve Foreman – percussion
 David Frank – piano
 John Frye – engineer
 Kevin W. – second engineer
 Brian Gardner – mastering
 Jamie Hawkins – keyboards
 Vincent Herbert – producer
 Jon Jubu Smith – guitar

Charts

Weekly charts

Year-end charts

Certifications

Release history

References

1998 debut albums
Columbia Records albums
Destiny's Child albums
Albums produced by Tim & Bob
Albums produced by Jermaine Dupri
Albums produced by Wyclef Jean
Albums produced by Cory Rooney